The Constitutional Reform Association of Hong Kong was a political group formed by expatriate British community striving for constitutional reform in Hong Kong in the late 1910s.

History
It was first launched in a well-attended meeting at the Theatre Royal on 3 May 1917 by the Hong Kong General Chamber of Commerce. It submitted a proposal of introducing unofficial majority in the Legislative Council of Hong Kong to the House of Commons of the United Kingdom through member of parliament Colonel John Ward but was rejected by the Colonial Office.

On 9 January 1919, a resolution was passed at its public meeting for an unofficial majority in the Legislative Council, and for seven members elected, one each by the Hong Kong General Chamber of Commerce, the Justices of Peace, the Chinese Chamber of Commerce and four (one Portuguese and three British) by British subjects on the jurors list.

Governor Reginald Stubbs commented the Association in 1920 as a "farcical body", when the Association consisted of a few dozen persons, most of whom took no part in the proceedings and appeared to be moribund. By October 1923, the Constitutional Reform Association ceased to exist.

References

Politics of Hong Kong
Political organisations based in Hong Kong
1917 establishments in Hong Kong
1923 disestablishments in Hong Kong
Political parties established in 1917